The 1976–77 Chicago Black Hawks season was the Hawks' 51st season in the NHL, and the club was coming off a 32–30–18 record in 1975–76, earning 82 points, and finishing in first place in the Smythe Division.  In the playoffs, the Black Hawks were quickly swept out in four games by the Montreal Canadiens in the NHL quarter-finals.

During the off-season, the Hawks made a big free agent signing, as the club signed eight time Norris Trophy winner Bobby Orr.  Orr missed the majority of the 1975–76 due to a knee injury, as he was limited to ten games in his final season with the Boston Bruins.  The team also named Keith Magnuson to become a tri-captain, joining Stan Mikita and Pit Martin in that role.  The NHL also made a few changes, as the Kansas City Scouts were relocated to Denver, Colorado, and renamed the Colorado Rockies, while the California Seals moved to Cleveland, Ohio, and were renamed the Cleveland Barons.

The Black Hawks got off to a solid start to the season, as in the month of October, they had a 7–5–1 record, however, injuries took a toll on the team, and the Hawks fell into a slump.  The Hawks went 3–14–4 in their next 21 games which cost longtime head coach Billy Reay his job.  Reay had been with Chicago since 1963, and left the team with a record of 516-335-161 in his fourteen seasons with the club.  He was replaced by recently retired Black Hawks defenseman Bill White, who played with the team from 1969–1975.  Under White, the Hawks played better hockey, as they went 13–12–5 in his first 30 games, however, the team would go on an eight-game losing streak, and find themselves battling the Vancouver Canucks for the final playoff spot in the Smythe Division.  The Hawks eventually finished the season with a 26–43–11 record, earning 63 points, and squeaked into the post-season.  The 26 victories and 63 points was their fewest total since the team won 24 games and earned 55 points in 1957–58, while their 43 losses was their highest since losing 51 games in 1953–54.

Offensively, the Black Hawks were led by Ivan Boldirev, who had a team high 24 goals, 38 assists and 62 points.  Darcy Rota tied Boldirev for the team lead in goals, as he also scored 24 times, while earning 46 points.  Pit Martin had 17 goals and 53 points, while Stan Mikita had 19 goals and 49 points while appearing in only 57 games.  On defense, Dick Redmond led the way, scoring 22 goals and 47 points, while Phil Russell had 9 goals and 45 points from the blueline, along with a team high 233 penalty minutes.  Bobby Orr, limited to only 20 games, earned 23 points, while posting a team best +6 rating.

In goal, Tony Esposito played the majority of the games, winning 25 games, while registering a GAA of 3.45, and earning two shutouts.

The Hawks opened the playoffs in a best of three preliminary series against the New York Islanders, who finished in second place in the Patrick Division with 106 points, which was 43 more than the Hawks.  The series opened with two games at Nassau Veterans Memorial Coliseum in New York, and the Islanders made quick work of the Hawks in the first game, easily winning 5–2 to take the series lead.  New York would then complete the two game sweep, narrowly defeating the Hawks 2–1 in the second game, as Chicago was swept out of the playoffs for the second consecutive season. The Black Hawks were originally scheduled as the home team for the second game, but its home rink Chicago Stadium had already been booked that night for the second of three Led Zeppelin concerts.

Season standings

Game log

Regular season

New York Islanders 2, Chicago Black Hawks 0

Season stats

Scoring leaders

Goaltending

Playoff stats

Scoring leaders

Goaltending

Draft picks
Chicago's draft picks at the 1976 NHL Amateur Draft at the NHL Office in Montreal, Quebec.

References

Sources
Hockey-Reference
Rauzulu's Street
Goalies Archive
HockeyDB
National Hockey League Guide & Record Book 2007

Chicago Blackhawks seasons
Chicago Blackhawks
Chicago Blackhawks